Son of Oklahoma is a 1932 American Western film directed by Robert N. Bradbury and starring his son Bob Steele.

Cast
Bob Steele - Dan Clayton
Josie Sedgwick - Mary Clayton, aka Shotgun Mary
Carmen Laroux - Anita Verdugo
Julian Rivero - Don Manuel Verdugo
Robert Homans - John Clayton, aka Silent Jack Clay
Henry Roquemore - Salesman Stage Passenger
Earl Dwire - Ray Brent

References

External links

1932 films
Films directed by Robert N. Bradbury
American Western (genre) films
1932 Western (genre) films
American black-and-white films
1930s American films